Daniel Gabriel Ciobanu (born 1 November 1993) is a Romanian professional footballer who plays as a defender. In his career, Ciobanu also played for teams such as Farul Constanța, FC Brașov, Pandurii Târgu Jiu or Dacia Unirea Brăila, among others.

Honours

Dante Botoșani 
Liga III: 2021–22

References

External links
 
 

1993 births
Living people
People from Târgu Frumos
Romanian footballers
Association football defenders
Liga I players
Liga II players
Liga III players
FC Politehnica Iași (2010) players
CSM Roman (football) players
FCV Farul Constanța players
ACS Foresta Suceava players
FC Brașov (1936) players
CS Pandurii Târgu Jiu players
CS Luceafărul Oradea players
CSM Reșița players
AFC Dacia Unirea Brăila players